The Lucas L-6A, also called the L6A, is a French low-wing, two-seats in tandem motor glider that was designed by Emile Lucas of Lagny-le-Sec in the form of plans for amateur construction.

Design and development
The L-6A was developed as a motor glider version of the Lucas L6 light aircraft.

The L-6A is of all-metal construction. The  span wing can be folded for ground transportation or storage and the wing tips are removable. The landing gear is of a retractable conventional landing gear configuration.

The L-6A was only available as plans and no kits or completed aircraft were factory-made. The plans cost US$400 in 2002 and at that time two examples were reported complete and flying. The construction time is estimated as 4000 hours.

Specifications (L-6A)

See also

References

External links

Image of L-6A

1990s French sailplanes
Homebuilt aircraft
L-6A
Single-engined tractor aircraft
Motor gliders
Low-wing aircraft